The men's doubles tournament at the 1993 French Open was held from 24 May until 6 June 1993 on the outdoor clay courts at the Stade Roland Garros in Paris, France. Luke Jensen and Murphy Jensen won the title, defeating Marc-Kevin Goellner and David Prinosil in the final.

Seeds

Draw

Finals

Top half

Section 1

Section 2

Bottom half

Section 3

Section 4

External links
 Association of Tennis Professionals (ATP) – main draw
1993 French Open – Men's draws and results at the International Tennis Federation

Men's Doubles
French Open by year – Men's doubles